A tidal disruption event (TDE) is an astronomical phenomenon that occurs when a star approaches sufficiently close to a supermassive black hole (SMBH) to be pulled apart by the black hole's tidal force, experiencing spaghettification. A portion of the star's mass can be captured into an accretion disk around the black hole (if the star is on a parabolic orbit), resulting in a temporary flare of electromagnetic radiation as matter in the disk is consumed by the black hole. According to early papers, tidal disruption events should be an inevitable consequence of massive black holes' activity hidden in galaxy nuclei, whereas later theorists concluded that the resulting explosion or flare of radiation from the accretion of the stellar debris could be a unique signpost for the presence of a dormant black hole in the center of a normal galaxy. Sometimes a star can survive the encounter with an SMBH, and a remnant is formed. These events are termed partial TDEs.

History 
Physicist John A. Wheeler suggested that the breakup of a star in the ergosphere of a rotating black hole could induce acceleration of the released gas to relativistic speeds by the so-called "tube of toothpaste effect". Wheeler succeeded in applying the relativistic generalization of the classical Newtonian tidal disruption problem to the neighbourhood of a Schwarzschild or Kerr black hole. However, these early works restricted their attention to incompressible star models or to stars penetrating slightly into the Roche radius, conditions in which the tides would have small amplitude.

In 1976, astronomers Juhan Frank and Martin J. Rees of the Cambridge Institute of Astronomy explored the possibility of black holes at the centers of galaxies and globular clusters, defining a critical radius under which stars are disturbed and swallowed by the black hole, suggesting that it is possible to observe these events in certain galaxies. But at the time, the English researchers did not propose any precise model or simulation.

This speculative prediction and this lack of theoretical tools aroused the curiosity of Jean-Pierre Luminet and Brandon Carter of the Paris Observatory in the early 1980s who invented the concept of a TDE. Their first works were published in 1982 in the journal Nature and 1983 in Astronomy & Astrophysics. The authors had managed to describe the tidal disturbances in the heart of active galactic nuclei (AGNs) based on the "stellar pancake outbreak" model, to use Luminet's expression, a model describing the tidal field generated by a supermassive black hole, and the effect they called the "pancake detonation" to qualify the radiation outbreak resulting from these disturbances. Later, in 1986, Luminet and Carter published in the journal Astrophysical Journal Supplement an analysis covering all the cases of TDE and not only the 10% producing "spaghettifications" and other "pancakes flambées".

It was only a decade later, in 1990, that the first TDE-compliant candidates were detected through the "All Sky" X-ray survey of DLR's and NASA's ROSAT satellite. Since then, more than a dozen candidates have been discovered, including more active sources in ultraviolet or visible light, for a reason that remained mysterious.

Discovery 
Finally, the theory of Luminet and Carter was confirmed by the observation of spectacular eruptions resulting from the accretion of stellar debris by a massive object located in the heart of an AGN (e.g. NGC 5128 or NGC 4438) and also in the heart of the Milky Way (Sgr A*). The TDE theory even explains the superluminous supernova SN 2015L, better known by the code name ASASSN-15lh, a supernova that exploded just before being absorbed beneath the horizon of a massive black hole.

Today, all known TDEs and TDE candidates have been listed in "The Open TDE Catalog" run by the Harvard CfA, which has had 98 entries since 1999.

New observations 
In September 2016, a team from the University of Science and Technology of China in Hefei, Anhui, China, announced that using data from NASA Wide-field Infrared Survey Explorer, a stellar tidal disruption event was observed at a known black hole. Another team at Johns Hopkins University in Baltimore, Maryland, U.S., detected three additional events. In each case, astronomers hypothesized that the astrophysical jet created by the dying star would emit ultraviolet and X-ray radiation, which would be absorbed by the dust surrounding the black hole and emitted as infrared radiation. Not only was this infrared emission detected, but they concluded that the delay between the jet's emission of ultraviolet and X-ray radiation and the dust's emission of infrared radiation may be used to estimate the size of the black hole devouring the star.

In September 2019, scientists using the TESS satellite announced they had witnessed a tidal disruption event called ASASSN-19bt, 375 million light-years away.

In July 2020, astronomers reported the observation of a "hard tidal disruption event candidate" associated with ASASSN-20hx, located near the nucleus of galaxy NGC 6297, and noted that the observation represented one of the "very few tidal disruption events with hard powerlaw X-ray spectra".

Tidal-disruption radius 
The tidal-disruption radius,  is the distance at which a black hole of mass  would tidally disrupt an approaching star of radius  and mass , given approximately by:

Usually, the tidal-disruption radius of a black hole is bigger than its Schwarzschild radius, but considering the radius and mass of the star fixed there is a mass for the black hole where both radii become equal meaning that at this point the star would simply disappear before being torn apart.

See also

 Gamma-ray burst#Tidal disruption events
 Super soft X-ray source#Large amplitude outbursts
 RX J1242-11

References

External links
 The Open TDE catalog, a catalog of claimed tidal disruption events.

Black holes
Stellar phenomena
Gamma-ray bursts
Astronomical events
Astronomical X-ray sources